The LG Optimus Q, also known as the LG LU2300 is a high-end smartphone manufactured by LG Electronics for the South Korean market. It is LG's first high-end handset to run Google's Android operating system.

The handset features a slide-out QWERTY keyboard, and a capacitive touchscreen display.

See also
Galaxy Nexus
List of Android devices

References

Android (operating system) devices
Mobile phones introduced in 2010
LG Electronics smartphones
Discontinued smartphones